Lake Street Dive is a multi-genre band that was formed in 2004 at the New England Conservatory of Music in Boston. The band's founding members are Rachael Price, Mike "McDuck" Olson, Bridget Kearney, and Mike Calabrese. Keyboardist Akie Bermiss joined the band on tour in 2017 and was first credited on their 2018 album Free Yourself Up; guitarist James Cornelison joined in 2021, after Olson left the band. The band is based in Brooklyn and frequently tours in North America, Australia, and Europe.

Early history
The group was formed in 2004 as a "free country band"; they intended to play country music in an improvised, avant-garde style. This concept was abandoned in favor of something that "actually sounded good", according to Mike Olson.

In 2005, bandmember Bridget Kearney won the Jazz Category of the John Lennon Songwriting Contest with the band's performance of her song "Sometimes When I'm Drunk and You're Wearing My Favorite Shirt".  Using their prize ($1,000 cash and 1,000 CDs produced by Disc Makers) Lake Street Dive released their debut album In This Episode... in 2006. The band released their next album Promises, Promises in 2008. The full-length concert film and live album Live at the Lizard Lounge was recorded in 2010 and released in 2011.

In the early years, Lake Street Dive juggled their tours with other commitments. Between their first brief performance in a Des Moines, Iowa rock club in 2007 and their May 2011 appearance at The Berkeley Cafe in Raleigh, North Carolina, they performed around 100 times in 24 states. In September and October 2011 they traveled to 13 states and played in 22 venues.

Label eras

Signature Sounds

Lake Street Dive released their first Signature Sounds Recordings album, Lake Street Dive, in November 2010. They credit Jim Olsen, president of Signature Sound, as being the band's dad, "because of all the support he gave us when we were so infantile."

By 2012 the four-piece band decided to make a strong commitment as a group and to tour. Bridget Kearney left her other band, Joy Kills Sorrow, to concentrate on Lake Street Dive. Mike Calabrese also left his other band, Ward Hayden and The Outliers (then known as Girls, Guns, and Glory), to focus on Lake Street Dive. They went into the studio to record the album Fun Machine and some singles in November 2012.

Lead singer Rachael Price was still under contract with another label, Claire Vision. This prevented them from releasing the album recorded in the fall of 2012 featuring Price. In late 2013, an agreement was reached and Lake Street Dive announced the release of their album Bad Self Portraits in February 2014.

In 2013 and 2014 they played over 300 gigs in more than 175 different cities, spread between 43 states and 8 countries. Their Bad Self Portraits tour sold out in 40 venues at the start of 2014.

On YouTube, their Jackson 5 cover of "I Want You Back" on a street corner has received more than 6 million views. Its viral success helped promote the band's visibility and popularity. Their performance at the 2013 FreshGrass Festival was filmed and directed by noted Brooklyn audio/visual collective Mason Jar Music. In December 2013, T Bone Burnett asked them to perform on the Another Day, Another Time show at The Town Hall (New York City) featuring music from and inspired by the Coen brothers film Inside Llewyn Davis. Lake Street Dive has appeared on many television shows: The Colbert Report, The Late Show with David Letterman, Conan , and The Ellen DeGeneres Show. 

The band has uploaded numerous videos, including their annual, humorous Halloween covers.

The band made some significant changes in their operations in 2015. In the winter of that year they started work with Dave Cobb on a new record/CD in Nashville, signed with Nonesuch Records in November, and prepared for the release of the new album. In 2015 they performed at only 98 venues. However, they toured Australia and New Zealand in March, then picked up their usual pace until December. Their traditional Halloween video was Queen's "Bohemian Rhapsody".

Nonesuch Records
Lake Street Dive signed with Nonesuch Records in 2015 and released Side Pony in February 2016 with their new label.  The album's name refers to a hairstyle adopted by Kearney and is slang for "unexpectedly diverting the mind's attention". The band made 183 appearances in 2017 and 2018, including tours through North America, Europe, Japan, New Zealand, and Australia.

The band released their second album with Nonesuch, Free Yourself Up in May 2018. Kearney says, "This album is based in the realities in our time which have inevitably become part of everyone's daily life. It's something you think about and obsess over—and write songs about. Free Yourself Up is about empowering yourself, emboldening yourself, no matter what's going wrong." In November 2018, they released Freak Yourself Out, a five-song EP of songs written but not recorded for Free Yourself Up.

The band wrote the theme song for Somebody Feed Phil with the show's creator Philip Rosenthal and recorded the song. The song was nominated for an Emmy award for original main title theme music.

On May 10, 2021, trumpeter and guitarist Mike "McDuck" Olson announced he would be leaving Lake Street Dive after 16 years of performing with the band.

In 2021 the band was inter alia part of the Newport Folk Festival in July.

Fantasy Records
In September 2022, the band released "Fun Machine: The Sequel" through Fantasy Records. Collectively, the band described the EP in this way, "Imagine you walk into your favorite local dive bar and Lake Street Dive is on stage, doing our regular weekly gig for $5 a head. These are the songs we’d be covering there and how we’d be playing them. Some deep cuts, some sentimental favorites and some (hopefully) epic crowd pleasers.".

Influences 
All the band members were singing and/or playing musical instruments by the time they were in third grade. Most had some classical music training growing up and their parents were musicians. Each had migrated to jazz by the time they met. However, the band says they were influenced by the music their parents were playing at home. This ranged from classic jazz to '60s soul to rock and roll.

The band members profess to love the entire Beatles discography. Kearney wrote "Hello? Goodbye!" and the band plays "Don't Make Me Hold Your Hand", both referencing Beatles tunes. Olson says he was inspired by Paul McCartney's love/vice lyrical concept in "Got to Get You Into My Life" when he wrote "You Go Down Smooth".

The band's traditional Halloween specials and covers on the EP release Fun Machine give an idea of the genres that influence them. These range from songs by the Mamas and the Papas, ABBA, the Drifters, Fleetwood Mac, Hall & Oates, Jackson 5 and Paul McCartney.

The band has been influenced by classic pop and swing era jazz. "We want it to sound like the Beatles and Motown had a party together," says drummer Mike Calabrese. Critics describe their music as "Sounds Like: Llewyn Davis's favorite pop group; Motown meets the Brill Building in jazzy, soulful, woulda-been Sixties chart toppers."

Price has said that the band's performances are influenced by the audience in front of them. "We are translating [crowd energy] on stage, trying to figure out what kind of energy to put out to the crowds. For the first time we feel we can mold the energy of a room."

Members 
Current
Rachael Price – lead vocals, ukulele, guitar (2004–present)
Bridget Kearney – acoustic bass, electric bass, piano, vocals (2004–present)
Mike Calabrese – drums, organ, vocals (2004–present)
Akie Bermiss – keyboards, organ, vocals (2017–present)
James Cornelison – guitar, vocals (2021–present) 

Former members
Mike "McDuck" Olson – trumpet, guitar, piano, organ, vocals (2004–2021)

Timeline

Discography

Albums

Studio albums

Live albums

EPs

Singles

Notes

References

External links 

 
 Playlist on WaveCat
 Lake Street Dive Facebook
 I Want You Back YouTube video

2004 establishments in Massachusetts
American pop music groups
Musical groups established in 2004
Musical groups from Boston
New England Conservatory alumni
Nonesuch Records artists
Signature Sounds artists